Krašić is a village and municipality in central Croatia, located near Jastrebarsko and Ozalj, south of Žumberak and north of Kupa, about 50 km southwest of Zagreb. Krašić comprises an area of about 3.63 km2. In the 2011 census, the total population was 2,640, in the following settlements:

 Barovka, population 18
 Begovo Brdo Žumberačko, population 13
 Brezarić, population 270
 Brlenić, population 195
 Bukovica Prekriška, population 33
 Careva Draga, population 5
 Čučići, population 0
 Čunkova Draga, population 24
 Dol, population 174
 Donje Prekrižje, population 48
 Gornje Prekrižje, population 50
 Hrženik, population 106
 , population 102
 Jezerine, population 32
 Konjarić Vrh, population 18
 Kostel Pribićki, population 50
 Krašić, population 616
 Krnežići, population 34
 Krupače, population 54
 Kučer, population 32
 Kurpezova Gorica, population 9
 Medven Draga, population 31
 Mirkopolje, population 93
 Pećno, population 10
 Pribić, population 262
 Pribić Crkveni, population 173
 Prvinci, population 8
 Radina Gorica, population 17
 Rude Pribićke, population 19
 Staničići Žumberački, population 2
 Strmac Pribićki, population 111
 Svrževo, population 28
 Vranjak Žumberački, population 3

In the 2011 census, the inhabitants were almost all Croats (99.43%).

Krašić is the birthplace of the late Croatian Cardinal Blessed Aloysius Stepinac.

References

External links

 Krašić

Populated places in Zagreb County
Municipalities of Croatia